William "Bill" Helburn (February 19, 1924 – November 3, 2020) was an American fashion and advertising photographer, best known for images published in magazines including Harper’s Bazaar, Vogue, Life, Town and Country, Esquire and Charm. Over the course of his career, Helburn won more than 46 professional awards for magazine and television ads. He died in November 2020 at the age of 96.

Early life 
William Helburn was born in New York City. He attended public and private schools in Manhattan and also took classes at The Art Students League of New York, before joining the U.S. Army Air Force in 1942. Helburn served in the Pacific theatre where he and future partner Ted Croner learned to make contact sheets and develop film, including the first pictures of the atomic bomb attack on Hiroshima.

Becoming a photographer 

Following the war Helburn and Croner resolved to become fashion photographers after Croner, on a weekend ski trip to Stowe, Vermont, encountered photographer Fernand Fonssagrives taking nude pictures of his model wife Lisa in the snow. After an encouraging visit to Fonssagrives studio, Helburn and Croner rented studio space in Manhattan and began taking pictures of aspiring models. 

The two men soon enrolled in Harper’s Bazaar Art Director Alexey Brodovitch’s Design Laboratory, a workshop for aspiring photographers and graphic designers. While the partnership with Croner soon ended, studying with Brodovitch led to Helburn’s first major assignment as a professional, a ten-page editorial shoot in the March 1949 edition of Junior Bazaar (a supplement to Harper’s Bazaar).

Helburn, Doyle Dane Bernbach, and the "Creative Revolution" in advertising 
1949 also saw the launch of Doyle Dane Bernbach, the agency that would spark advertising’s creative revolution. While Helburn photographed for numerous agencies, he worked frequently for Doyle Dane, teaming with art directors including Robert Gage, Helmut Krone, and Gene Federico.  

As an advertising photographer, Helburn shot for accounts including Oleg Cassini, Van Heusen, Cole of California, Supima Cotton, Cuddle Coat, Napier Jewelry, Ohrbachs, Volkswagen, DKW Auto Union, Cadillac, Chrysler, Buick, Polaroid, Coca-Cola, Revlon, Helene Curtis, Yardley, and Max Factor.

Auto racing 
After buying a Ferrari Testarossa, Helburn raced, either for Team Ferrari or as an independent, in events sanctioned by the National Sports Car Club of America (SCCA), Fédération Internationale de l'Automobile (FIA) and the Cuban Sport Commission, between 1956 and 1961. 

In 1957, his most active year, Helburn raced eight times, with his team finishing second at the SCCA Regional Thompson, fifth in the Cuban Grand Prix and ninth in the Nassau Trophy Race. Helburn raced just once in 1961, finishing ninth in the Sebring 12-Hour Florida International Grand Prix.

Later career 
Helburn continued to work as a fashion and advertising photographer through the early 1980s. He was married to model Sue Jenks from 1948 to 1964. He divorced her and married Ford model Angela Howard in 1965 and divorced her in 1969. Helburn had five children: sons Will, Chance and Hardy and daughters Robin and Brooke. As his career as a still photographer declined, Helburn shot and directed television commercials for accounts including The Partnership for A Drug-Free America, Mobil Oil and Napier Jewelers.

Professional awards 
Helburn’s awards, include thirteen American Institute of Graphic Arts (AIGA) ‘Certificates of Excellence/Fifty Advertisements of the Year’ and three ‘Clio Awards for Advertising Excellence Worldwide.’

Exhibitions
Solo exhibitions
 2015 “Retrospective” Peter Fetterman Gallery, Santa Monica, USA 
 2016  “Retrospective” Staley-Wise Gallery, New York, NY USA

Group exhibitions
 2018 “The Fashion Show” Peter Fetterman Gallery, Santa Monica, USA
 2018 “Changes” Staley-Wise Gallery, New York, NY USA

References 

1924 births
2020 deaths
Photographers from New York City
United States Army Air Forces personnel of World War II
Harper's Bazaar
Fashion photographers
12 Hours of Sebring drivers
Racing drivers from New York City